"Too Late for Goodbyes" is the first single (second in the U.S.) from Julian Lennon's 1984 album Valotte. It featured the harmonica of Jean "Toots" Thielemans, and it was a top-10 hit, reaching No. 6 in the UK Singles Chart in November 1984, and No. 5 on the Billboard Hot 100 singles chart in late March 1985. B-side "Big Mama" has been described by Lennon as "semi-hard rock".

Cash Box said that "a galloping reggae backbeat and some exquisite Muscle Shoals guitar work back up Lennon’s spare lyric phrasing and lend the song a strong ride."

"Too Late for Goodbyes" peaked at #1 on 16 March 1985 at the U.S. Adult Contemporary chart, spending two weeks at the top of this chart. The music video for the song was directed by Sam Peckinpah, and produced by Martin Lewis. To date, it is the most successful song of Lennon's career.

This song was dedicated to Julian's late father John Lennon, who was killed in 1980, though Julian Lennon has stated that the song was not about his relationship with his father, but was instead about a woman.

Track listing
UK 7" single (Charisma JL1)
"Too Late for Goodbyes" – 3:30
"Well I Don't Know" – 4:35

US 7" single (Atlantic 7-89589)
"Too Late for Goodbyes" – 3:30
"Let Me Be" – 2:12

UK 12" single (Charisma JL112)
"Too Late for Goodbyes" – 3:30
"Big Mama" – 3:16 
"Well I Don't Know" – 4:35

US 12" single (Atlantic 0-86899)
"Too Late for Goodbyes (Extended Special Mix)" – 5:55
"Too Late for Goodbyes" – 3:30
"Let Me Be" – 2:12

Musicians
 Julian Lennon – lead vocals and backing vocals, synthesizers, electronic drums and drum machine
 Barry Beckett – synthesizer
 Justin Clayton – rhythm guitar 
 Martin Briley – rhythm guitar
 Marcus Miller – bass
 Toots Thielemans – harmonica

In popular culture
 The song is featured in the video game Grand Theft Auto V on the in-game radio station, Los Santos Rock Radio.

Charts and certifications

Weekly charts

Year-end charts

Certifications

See also
List of number-one adult contemporary singles of 1985 (U.S.)

References

External links
  

Julian Lennon songs
1984 debut singles
1985 singles
Song recordings produced by Phil Ramone
Songs written by Julian Lennon
1984 songs
Chrysalis Records singles
Atlantic Records singles
Charisma Records singles